Ida Schnall (27 August 1889 - 14 February 1973) was the captain of the New York Female Giants baseball team and later a Hollywood actress.

Biography
Perhaps the greatest female athlete of her time, Schnall excelled at multiple sports including baseball, swimming, diving and tennis. She was also a fitness instructor and dancer. The 1912 Summer Olympics were opened to female divers and swimmers, but Schnall and other women were barred from participating by James Edward Sullivan of the United States Olympic Committee.  In 1915 Schnall was named America's most beautifully formed woman. She died on 14 February 1973 in Los Angeles, California.

Filmography

Runaway June (1915)
Undine (1916)

References

External links

American female baseball players